Barcelona Sessions is the fifth studio album of Swedish singer Måns Zelmerlöw. It was released on 5 February 2014 in Sweden. The album peaked at number three on the Swedish Albums Chart and includes the singles "Broken Parts", "Beautiful Life" and "Run for Your Life"—though none of these singles placed in the Swedish charts.

Singles
"Broken Parts" was released as the lead single from the album on 25 February 2013. "Beautiful Life" was released as the second single from the album on 13 September 2013. "Run for Your Life" was released as the third and final single from the album on 14 January 2014.

Track listing

Charts

Release history

References

2014 albums
Måns Zelmerlöw albums
Warner Music Sweden albums